Balranald Shire is a local government area in the Riverina area of western New South Wales, Australia on the Sturt Highway.  It is the location of World Heritage listed Mungo National Park.  It includes the towns of Balranald and Euston. Other localities in the Shire include Kyalite, Hatfield, Penarie, Clare and Oxley.

As of 29 January 2020, the Balranald Shire Council Mayor and elected members were dismissed by NSW local government minister Shelley Hancock, after the recommendations of the report of commissioner Roslyn McCulloch. Mike Colreavy has been appointed the administrator until local council elections in 2024.

Demographics

Council

Current composition and election method

The Balranald Shire Council is currently under administration, as of 29 January 2020. NSW local government minister Shelley Hancock accepted the recommendations of the report created by commissioner Roslyn McCulloch.

Local Government Minister Shelley Hancock accepted the recommendation from the independent commissioner of the public inquiry to dismiss the council's mayor and councillors and appoint an administrator to address financial and structural issues.

The report, which has been tabled in Parliament, found:
• The council has failed to command the confidence of its community
• Councillors have failed to appreciate the need for sound and consistent financial principles, with division among councillors affecting decision making;
• An absence of understanding by councillors of the importance of transparency in decision making, including inappropriate closure of council meetings;
• The council has failed to act as a responsible employer, particularly regarding the interaction between councillors and council staff, resulting in the loss of valuable personnel; and
• The council has failed to comply with its obligations as Reserve Trust Manager under the Crown Lands Act in relation to Balranald Caravan Park.

"I have not taken the decision to dismiss the council lightly", Mrs Hancock said.

"The ratepayers of Balranald Shire deserve a strong council that is representing the best interests of the community.

"I have accepted the recommendation by Commissioner Roslyn McCulloch to dismiss the elected representatives and appoint an administrator to perform the role of the mayor and councillors until 2024.

"This course of action will provide the best possible way to strengthen the operation, performance and sustainability of the council and ensure it is serving the best interests of the local community".

Mike Colreavy has been appointed administrator of Balranald Shire Council. Mr Colreavy has 37 years' experience in the local government sector at metropolitan, regional and rural councils including holding various general manager positions.

Localities

Condoulpe is situated about 15 kilometres south of Balranald and 21 kilometres north of Kyalite.

References

External links

Condoulpe Parish map of 1927

 
Local government areas of the Riverina